James Wheeler may refer to:
James Wheeler (cricketer) (1913–1977), English cricketer
James Atkin Wheeler (c. 1800?–1861), Australian politician, member of the Victorian Legislative Council
James Talboys Wheeler (1824–1897), bureaucrat-historian of the British Raj
James Wheeler (American politician) (1793–1854), American politician in Michigan
James Wheeler (Australian politician) (1826–1904), member of the Victorian Legislative Assembly
James Wheeler (musician) (1937–2014), American Chicago blues guitarist, singer and songwriter
James G. Wheeler (1924–2014), American politician in Massachusetts

See also
 Jimmy Wheeler (disambiguation)
 Jim Wheeler (born 1953), Nevada politician
 James E. Wheeler House, located in Portland, Oregon